The former Christian Science Society, also known as the John B. McCreary House, and, most recently, as The Abbey, is an historic Victorian building located at 34 Gurney Street, corner of Columbia Street, in Cape May, New Jersey. Designed by Philadelphia architect Stephen Decatur Button, it was built for $20,000 between 1869-1870 for State Senator John B. McCreary, a Pennsylvania coal baron.

It is a contributing property in the Cape May Historic District, which was added to the National Register of Historic Places in 1970.

From 1979 to 2012, the structure was operated as The Abbey Bed and Breakfast Inn. The couple extensively restored the building while adding bathrooms for each suite.

Due to increasing operating costs and lower demand for the bed and breakfasts, they put the property up for sale in 2006. It was sold early in 2012. The new owners will rent out the whole house rather than individual rooms. Those renting such units are not required to pay the 7-percent room tax levied on inn and hotel clients, which Jay Schatz believes to be a factor in the declining bed and breakfast business.

Gallery

References

External links

Former Christian Science churches, societies and buildings in the United States
Cape May, New Jersey
Historic American Buildings Survey in New Jersey
Houses completed in 1870
Historic district contributing properties in New Jersey
National Register of Historic Places in Cape May County, New Jersey
Churches on the National Register of Historic Places in New Jersey
Defunct organizations based in New Jersey